The second government was organized by Volodymyr Vynnychenko after Dmytro Doroshenko government of which was confirmed on August 14, resigned on August 18. Many ministers picked by Doroshenko were left at their positions, while other ministries were filled by Social-Democrats. The new Secretariat was confirmed by the Russian Provisional Government on September 1.

Designation of the government portfolios by parties (in parenthesis - after the III Universal on November 20):
Ukrainian 13 (13)
USDRP - 5 (6)
UPSF - 4 (2)
UPSR - 2 (4)
UPSI - 1 (1)
Non-partizan - 1 (0)
non-Ukrainian 1+3
Russian SR - 1 (0)
Jewish Bund - 0 (1)
UJSWP - 1 (1)
RRNSP - 1 (1)
PDCP - 1 (1)

Note:in red are members that were prosecuted for representing the Ukrainian government.

Note:
 Little or no information is available on Mykhailo Savchenko-Bilsky. Being a member of the Ukrainian Socialist-Revolutionaries, he was elected to the Secretariat as a representative of the Peasant Association. Until then Savchenko worked as an agronomist near Borzna (Chernigov Governorate). He resigned after the proclamation of the 3rd "Universal". During Hetmanate Savchenko was in the All-Ukrainian Zemstvo Union.

The expanded Secretariat (November 12, 1917).

Deputy-Secretary of Military Affairs - Oleksandr Zhukovsky (UPSR)
Deputy-Secretary of Education - P.Kholodny (UPSF)
Deputy-Secretary of Internal Affairs - I.Kraskovsky (UPSF), O.Karpynsky, and L.Abramovych

Deputy-Secretaries of Nationalities

At first the deputy secretaries of Nationalities were part of the secretariat of Nationalities headed initially by Yefremov. With the proclamation of the III Universal on December 22, 1917, on the initiative of Oleksandr Shulhyn the Secretariat of Nationalities was transformed into the Secretariat of Foreign Affairs. The position for the Russian Affairs representative for quite sometime was left unoccupied although was specifically reserved for the Russian Provisional Government. After the Secretariat was reorganized as the Council of Ministers the deputy-secretaries received their own ministerial assignments.

References

Ukrainian governments
1917 establishments in Ukraine
1918 disestablishments in Ukraine
Cabinets established in 1917
Cabinets disestablished in 1918
Ukrainian People's Republic